Calliptamus plebeius is a species of short-horned grasshopper in the family Acrididae. It is found in southern Europe and northern Africa.

The IUCN conservation status of Calliptamus plebeius is "LC", least concern, with no immediate threat to the species' survival. The IUCN status was assessed in 2016.

Subspecies
These subspecies belong to the species Calliptamus plebeius:
 Calliptamus plebeius bifasciata Krauss, 1892
 Calliptamus plebeius plebeius (Walker, 1870) (Canarian Pincer Grasshopper)

References

External links

 

Acrididae
Insects described in 1870